The 2015 elections to Nottingham City Council were held on 7 May 2015 to elect all 55 members to the Council across 20 wards.

Overall election results

|}

Nottingham City Council - Results by Ward

Arboretum

Aspley

Basford

Berridge

Bestwood

Bilborough

Bridge

Bulwell

Bulwell Forest

Clifton North

Clifton South

Dales

Dunkirk & Lenton

Leen Valley

Mapperley

Radford & Park

Sherwood

St Ann's

Wollaton East & Lenton Abbey

Wollaton West

References

2015
2015 English local elections
May 2015 events in the United Kingdom
2010s in Nottingham